South Africa is an education-oriented country, and it is also the country with the highest quality of education on the African continent. However, the level of education in Africa is generally not high. In the worldwide, South Africa is still considered to be a country with a low level of education in the world.

The direct cause of low education in South Africa can be considered to be backward in education management in South Africa.

The reasons for the education management problem in South Africa are diverse.

Firstly, it is unequal education, which can also be described as discriminatory education, caused by historical reasons. And secondly, the professional level of teaching managers and teaching staff is not high, which makes it difficult for the next generation to obtain a high-quality education. Finally, in terms of school management, students of different races and identities are often placed at distinct levels of education, which directly leads to educational inequality. Furthermore, this could lead to more and more cultural differences among students in the further to some degrees. On the other hand, in terms of finance, the quality of teaching has been restricted caused by insufficient teaching facilities and infrastructure, this is because the schooling funds have been declined. Also, the high dropout rate which made by the inability of families to provide tuition fees is the other reason that contributed to the poor education.

These results are related to the failure of education management, resulting in the backward education level in South Africa.

Correspondingly, the South African government has also placed more and more attention to improving the education management system. The South African government has made corresponding efforts to improve the professionalism of the staff of the education management department, education strategy management, school and teaching management, and also the relative education funds.

In the process of gradually improving education management, the level of education in South Africa is also increasing. However, the improvement of education management in South Africa is a long process, and the level of education management still needs to continue to improve.



Introduction of educational management in South Africa

System 
The education system in South Africa has been divided into three levels: primary education; secondary education and higher education, of which secondary schools including junior high school and senior high school.  Higher education is divided into two parts: vocational education and university education. All three levels are under the responsibility of the Ministry of Education.

Primary school 
Primary education in South Africa lasts for seven years (R-6 grades), and is divided into basic and intermediate stages, with a primary focus on basic education. During primary school, all courses are compulsory.

Students usually begin primary school at the age of six. At the elementary school level, the student's level is assessed by the test scores.

The qualification for elementary school graduation is carried out independently by each elementary school. There is no national level examination. At the end of the primary school cycle, no formal qualification certificate will be issued.

Secondary school 
Secondary education lasts for six years and is divided into two stages: junior high school and high school.

Junior high school (7-9 grades) is also called advanced stage and is mandatory.

High school (10-12 grades) has been known as further education and training (FET), which is not mandatory.

Students who enter the high school will choose academic or technical study. During High school, students will study seven courses which including four compulsory courses and three elective courses.

At the end of grade 12, there is a national standardised exam, of which graduation is based on the exam results. After graduation, there has a national certificate issued by the National Senior Certificate which also called “matric”.

Higher education 
There are two types of higher education in South Africa: vocational and technical education and university education.

Due to the high youth unemployment rate in South Africa, South Africa attaches great importance to technical education, with the aim of cultivating professional and technical talents to increase employment and promote economic development.

University education focuses on academic research, and public universities dominate.

Problem of educational management in South Africa

Discriminatory education 
Education inequality in South Africa is largely attributable to the apartheid system that has lasted for many years in South Africa (1948–1991). Although the government of South Africa has invested a great deal of money in education today, the quality of education has not been improved obviously. The discriminatory education still affects education and educational management in South Africa to some degree.

Leadership management 
Because of the racial discrimination, the selection of school leaders tends to not fair enough, which could cause the elected principals are not professional. This can often be translated into the fact that schooling cannot be effectively managed under the ineffective leadership.

In terms of management, the school might treat different teachers and students differently because of ethnic issues. This is to say, the education management has not achieved fairness, which is also unfavourable to the development of education management.

Teaching and schooling management 
In terms of teaching, the quality of the teaching provided by teachers is not high, because teachers themselves are educated by a low standard education system. Moreover, there has not a high standard for the teaching management, which leads to the high rate of absenteeism of teachers. According to SACMEQ III, in 2007, South Africa had highest rate of the absenteeism compared with other countries participating in the survey. Also, it is worth noting that the absentee rate continues to rise after the year of 2007.

On the other hand, the quality of teaching provided by teachers is not only related to the level of knowledge of the teachers themselves, but also to the beliefs and values of the teachers. To be more specific, the understanding of education and the meaning of teacher profession could also affect their attitudes in teaching to some degrees.

In addition, due to historical factors, racial discrimination in South Africa is also an essential factor affecting the quality of teaching. This could often be translated into the fact that teachers may influence their teaching attitudes and their attitudes towards students because of their own identity. Furthermore, the students who are different from the identity have put in distinct levels, which also results in the unbalanced education.

Finance

School funds 
The school does not have enough funds to support or protect a various type of infrastructure and learning site construction at the schools. In South Africa, a large number of school lack piped water, electricity sources, and also public health facilities. In terms of learning site construction, more than half of the schools in South Africa have not constructed libraries and laboratories. In addition, the teaching equipment and leaning materials are also restricted. The inadequate facilities could also be a significant factor which contributes to the limited education.

Tuition fees 
The loss of learning opportunities for students who are unable to afford to pay tuition fees is another important reason for the low level of education in South Africa.

Although the tuition fees of schools do not appear to be economically stressful for the family, according to the average monthly income for South African individuals shown by the survey. However, the gap between the rich and the poor in South Africa is largely, which can be translated into the fact that the average monthly income does not reflect the actual situation.

In higher education, more than half of South African youth say they are unable to pay tuition. This has led to the youth lack of access to education.

Improvement of educational management in South Africa

Leadership and management 
Leadership management shifts to participation and democracy, self-management should be accompanied by internal decentralization

The educational institution sets the initial entry qualification of the principal, professional professionals must qualify, which makes sure that those who are principals at school are suitable for the job.

Moreover, place more values on training and development of the principal.

Strategic management 
Improving school autonomy, providing a better school management team and establishing a governing body of schools.

Managing cultural diversity so that diversity can be re-recognise, which helps to help cultural inequality in the management of education.

Teaching and schooling management 
The school should guarantee the professionalism of the teachers to ensure a high level of education quality. Furthermore, the teaching materials should be considered to be improved.

Finance

Infrastructure 
The infrastructure of schools including water, power and also building construction has been planned to be strengthened.

Moreover, the government provides specialised and relevant education departments to implement and manage infrastructure construction.

Accelerated Schools Infrastructure Delivery Initiative (ASIDI) is responsible for strengthening the school infrastructure, The Department of Basic Education (DBE) focus on improving school infrastructure

This initiative makes the development of infrastructure plans more secure.

As a consequence, the quality of teaching will not be affected by the lack of infrastructure, such as water, electricity, school buildings and so on, which promoting the better learning environment as well.

Tuition fees 
The government establishes a school governing bodies (SGB). Tuition fees are set and managed by the institution. The families which are unable to pay tuition fees can apply to the institution to waive part or all of the tuition fees.

At the same time, South Africa is also developing more and more low-cost private schools in.

Development of visual learning 
Virtualisation courses development such as radio and video courses, social software online learning, which learners could get the knowledge though instead of paying for the real school. As a result, the development of various visual learning might solve problems that cannot be learned due to tuition fees to some degree.

References 

Education in South Africa